George Alexander McDonald (22 February 1893 – 18 April 1968) was an Australian rules footballer who played with St Kilda in the Victorian Football League (VFL).

Notes

External links 

1893 births
1968 deaths
Australian rules footballers from Melbourne
St Kilda Football Club players
People from Yarraville, Victoria